Crossway (previously known by its parent ministry Good News Publishers) is a not-for-profit evangelical Christian publishing ministry headquartered in Wheaton, Illinois. Clyde and Muriel Dennis founded Good News Publishers in 1938, working out of their home in Minneapolis, Minnesota.

Crossway is best known for publishing evangelical Christian books, along with the English Standard Version (ESV) translation of the Bible. Mark Ward, editor of Bible Study Magazine, has praised Crossway for its continuous commitment to technological innovation in publishing the ESV online.

Crossway 
In late 1978, Good News Publishers began expanding its reach by establishing Crossway, a publishing division. Beginning under the leadership of Lane T. Dennis—Clyde and Muriel's son—Crossway claims that it has published more than 1,500 titles, including books "by Francis A. Schaeffer, Martyn Lloyd-Jones, John Piper, John MacArthur, Paul David Tripp, Jen Wilkin, J. I. Packer, Chuck Colson, Frank Peretti, Max Lucado, Joni Eareckson Tada, and D. A. Carson."

ESV Bible translation 
In 2001, Crossway published the ESV translation of the Bible. The ESV translation committee describes the ESV as a translation that is "essentially literal", following a "word-for-word" philosophy.

According to Crossway, the publishing team behind the ESV "has included more than a hundred people."

In 2008, Crossway published the ESV Study Bible.

In 2016, Crossway made headlines after announcing that the ESV text would be "unchanged forever, in perpetuity" as a "permanent text" edition. After public discourse about the policy, Crossway announced that it would reverse the decision.

Notes

References

External links
 

Book publishing companies based in Illinois
Evangelical Christian publishing companies
Publishing companies established in 1938
Publishing companies established in 1978
Religious tract publishing companies
Wheaton, Illinois